Mikko Saarinen (born 4 April 1946) is a Finnish boxer. He competed in the men's light middleweight event at the 1972 Summer Olympics.

References

External links
 

1946 births
Living people
Finnish male boxers
Olympic boxers of Finland
Boxers at the 1972 Summer Olympics
People from Salo, Finland
Light-middleweight boxers
Sportspeople from Southwest Finland